Han Da-hye (born ) is a South Korean volleyball player. She is part of the South Korea women's national volleyball team.

She participated in the 2021 FIVB Volleyball Women's Nations League.
On a club level she was 5th pick in the third round of the 2013-2014 draft, signing for GS Caltex Seoul KIXX.

References

1996 births
Living people
South Korean women's volleyball players